Otter Plain is an ice plain between Sigurd Knolls on the north and the Muhlig-Hofmann and Drygalski Mountains on the south, in Queen Maud Land. Plotted from surveys and air photos by the Norwegian Antarctic Expedition (1956–60) and named after the Otter aircraft used by the expedition.

Plains of Queen Maud Land
Princess Astrid Coast